The second season of the television series Stargate Atlantis commenced airing on the Sci Fi Channel in the United States on July 15, 2005, concluded on The Movie Network in Canada on January 30, 2006, and contained 20 episodes. The show itself is a spin off of its sister show, Stargate SG-1. The series was developed by Brad Wright and Robert C. Cooper, who also served as executive producers. Season two regular cast members include Joe Flanigan, Torri Higginson, Rachel Luttrell, Jason Momoa, Paul McGillion, and David Hewlett as Dr. Rodney McKay. The second season focuses on the Atlantis Expedition continuing to make the Wraith think that the city self-destructed, (The Siege Part III) while continuing to explore Pegasus and hunt for ZPMs (although they do have one now) this means at times lying to new allies about the city even sometimes claiming to be a small contingent that escaped the Siege; the season also marks the first time the Expedition is able to make contact with Earth although doing so uses a lot of power so the contact is oftentimes via the Daedalus, an intergalactic Earth-Asgard vessel commanded by Col. Steven Caldwell who makes clear his desire to be Military Leader of Atlantis but eventually settles for a sort of advisory role as it becomes clear that Dr. Weir and the Lt.Col Sheppard are a duo not to be messed with. The central plot of the second season is the development of Dr. Beckett's retrovirus, which can, theoretically, turn a Wraith into a human.

The one-hour premiere, "The Siege Part III", aired on July 15, 2005. The theme song for the series received an Emmy nomination in the category "Outstanding Music Composition for a Series (Original Dramatic Score)". The series was developed by Brad Wright and Robert C. Cooper, who also served as executive producers. Season two regular cast members include Joe Flanigan, Torri Higginson, Rainbow Sun Francks, Rachel Luttrell, Jason Momoa and David Hewlett.

Cast
 Starring Joe Flanigan as Major/Lt. Colonel John Sheppard
 Torri Higginson as Dr. Elizabeth Weir
 Rachel Luttrell as Teyla Emmagan
 Rainbow Sun Francks as First Lieutenant Aiden Ford
 Jason Momoa as Ronon Dex
 With Paul McGillion as Dr. Carson Beckett
 And David Hewlett as Dr. Rodney McKay

Episodes

Episodes in bold are continuous episodes, where the story spans over 2 or more episodes.

Production
"Runner" is the last episode where Rainbow Sun Francks (portrayed Aiden Ford) is credited as a regular cast member. Jason Momoa joins the main cast in this episode. While rehearsing scenes for "Duet" where Cadman has control of McKay's body, Jamie Ray Newman would do a scene first, and then David Hewlett would try to mimic her movements, cadence, accent, etc. Alan C. Peterson, who played the Magistrate in "Condemned", previously played Canon in Stargate SG-1s Demons. The episode title of "Trinity" is a reference to the Trinity test. The outdoors parts of "Instinct" were filmed on location at Lynn Valley Canyon, North Vancouver. Jewel Staite, who played Kaylee Frye on the cult Sci-Fi show Firefly, is the second Firefly cast member to guest star on a Stargate series, the first being Adam Baldwin in Stargate SG-1 episode "Heroes". She would later go on to play Dr. Keller as a recurring guest star at the end of Season 3, continuing into Season 4 prior to becoming a series regular in season 5.

"Conversion" was actress Rachel Luttrell's first on-screen kissing scene. Her parents were present for the kiss. Every scene in "Aurora" where Ronon appears in the environmental suit had to be played by a body double because Jason Momoa's head would not fit in the helmet. The title of "The Long Goodbye" is an homage to Raymond Chandler's 1954 novel The Long Goodbye. "Coup D'état" was supposed to feature the return of Acastus Kolya (last seen in "The Brotherhood"), but because of conflicts with Robert Davi's schedule it was rewritten to feature Kolya's second in command Ladon instead. For "Allies", Brent Stait took over the role of Michael throughout the episode. Conner provided the voice after the crew felt it 'needed' it.

Release and reception
The strongest episodes on the Nielsen ratings were "The Siege" and "Instinct", "The Siege" was the only episode in the season that was able to get a syndication rating. The lowest rated episode in the season was "Michael". "The Hive" was nominated for a Gemini Award in the category "Best Sound in a Dramatic Series" in 2006. For "Grace Under Pressure", Joel Goldsmith was nominated for an Emmy in the category "Outstanding Music Composition for a Series (Original Dramatic Score)".

Don Houston from DVD Talk said that the second season did "rise to the occasion" and surpassed its sister show Stargate SG-1. ComingSoon reviewer  Scott Chitwood said  that it "should satisfy" viewers, but commented that it didn't have the same quality as Battlestar Galactica and gave the series 6 out of 10 and the DVD package 8 out of 10. June L. from Monsters and Critics (M&C) gave the season 4 out of 5 and said that it was a "pleasure to watch the stories", compared to other new science fiction shows which depends on blood and violence. Dan Heaton from Digitally Obsessed said that the season suffered an "identity crisis," but was throughout good and entertaining because of the good acting among others.

DVD releases

References

External links

 Season 2 on GateWorld
 Season 2 on IMDb
 Season 2 on TV.com
 

.2
2005 American television seasons
2006 American television seasons
Atlantis 02
2005 Canadian television seasons
2006 Canadian television seasons